Gujarat Vidya Sabha, originally called Gujarat Vernacular Society, is a literary institution for the promotion of vernacular Gujarati literature and education, and for the collection of manuscripts and printed books; located in the city of Ahmedabad, India. It was founded by a British administrator, Alexander Kinloch Forbes, in 1848 with the Gujarati author Dalpatram. The name was changed on the occasion of the centenary of the institution.

It published Gujarat's first newspaper, established the first Gujarati school for girls, the first library and the first Gujarati periodical.

History

Gujarat Vernacular Society was founded by British East India Company administrator, Alexander Kinloch Forbes on 26 December 1848 along with Dalpatram. The fund of Rs 9601 was raised from locals, Baroda State and British officers. The society had in 1877 a fund of £2791 (Rs. 27,910), of which £1000 (Rs. 10,000) were contributed by Premchand Raichand of Bombay. The first newspaper in Gujarat was started in Ahmedabad by this society. It was a weekly paper issued on Wednesday, Budhvar, and hence in Ahmedabad all newspapers were called Budhvariya during those times. The library, now included in the Hemabhai Institute, and the first girls' school in Ahmedabad, were established by the help of this society. Useful books were printed by it, and the publication of others was helped by money grants. It brought out a monthly magazine, Buddhiprakash, which in 1876 had a monthly sale of 1250 copies. The magazine is still published. The society helps libraries in all parts of Gujarat and Kathiawar, and gives prizes to schools. It undertakes to sell and distribute books, and offers annual prizes for essays on various useful subjects. A yearly prize of £15 (Rs. 150) is given for the best Gujarati essay on a given subject, the funds coming from an endowment of £250 (Rs. 2500) made in 1864 by a Bombay merchant, Sorabji Jamsedji Jijibai. Its library contained (1877) 1590 volumes in various languages. At the close of 1876 there were forty-eight life members, two yearly members, and two honorary members. Its yearly receipts amount to about £180 (Rs. 1800) and its expenditure to £129 (Rs. 1290).

The textile pioneer of Gujarat, Rao Bahadur Ranchhodlal Chhotalal, donated money to the Gujarat Vernacular Society to start a girls' high school, which was started in 1892 and was named RB Ranchhodlal Chhotalal Girls High School after the donor.

The society changed its name to Gujarat Vidya Sabha in 1946.

The Vidya Sabha is currently presided by the architect Balkrishna Doshi.

See also
Gujarati Sahitya Parishad
Gujarat Sahitya Sabha
Gujarat Sahitya Akademi

References

External links
 

Gujarati literature
Organisations based in Ahmedabad
1848 establishments in British India
Educational organisations based in India
Education in Gujarat
Non-profit organisations based in India
Indic literature societies
Founders of Indian schools and colleges